Ezra J. Carter (also known as Eck Carter; October 21, 1898 – January 22, 1975) was a member of the Carter Family of Virginia. Ezra Carter managed the famous Carter Family, a traditional American folk music group that recorded between 1927 and 1956. He was the husband of Maybelle Addington Carter (1909–1978), brother of Alvin Pleasant "A.P." Delaney Carter (1891–1960) and father of Helen Carter (1927–1998), June Carter (1929–2003) and Anita Carter (1933–1999).

Carter was born on October 21, 1898, in Maces Spring, Virginia and married Maybelle Addington in 1926. Using his car, the Carter Family drove to the original Bristol Sessions recordings in 1927 where Appalachian country music was recorded for one of the first times. He retired as a railroad postal worker and became the manager of the Carter Family group after the divorce of A.P. Carter and Sara Carter and directed the stage performances of his family. When the Grand Ole Opry invited the family to perform regularly but requested that they leave Chet Atkins out of the group, Ezra insisted that Chet remain. Carter was also responsible for constructing a dam and bringing the first electricity to Poor Valley, Virginia. He died on January 22, 1975, and is buried in Hendersonville, Tennessee. His home is now known as the Maybelle and Ezra Carter House in Maces Spring, Scott County, Virginia and is listed on the National Register of Historic Places.

References

Scott County, Virginia
Carter family of Virginia
Cash–Carter family
1898 births
1975 deaths